Wolfpacks ( were employed by Nazi Germany's Kriegsmarine during World War II against Allied and neutral shipping.

Outbreak of War
From the outbreak of war until mid-1940 there were various groups of U-boats engaged in collective patrols. With the exception of experimental Hartmann's wolfpack in 1939, the first recognised wolfpack was led by KrvKpt Günther Prien in June 1940.

Invasion of Norway & Denmark
In preparation for the impending invasion of Norway and Denmark, in early April 1940, 31 U-boats were ready for operations between England and Norway. On 6 April, the codeword "Hartmut" was transmitted and German submarines began their designated operations.

Wolfpacks

Bibliography

References
 

 01
World War II submarines of Germany
Lists of military units and formations of Germany
Military units and formations of the Kriegsmarine
U-boats
World War II naval-related lists
Germany in World War II-related lists